Ponte San Nicolò is a comune (municipality) in the Province of Padua in the Italian region Veneto, located about  west of Venice and about  southeast of Padua.

The municipality of Ponte San Nicolò contains the frazioni (subdivisions, mainly villages and hamlets) Roncaglia, Roncajette, and Rio.

Ponte San Nicolò borders the following municipalities: Albignasego, Casalserugo, Legnaro, Padua, Polverara.

The mayor is Martino Schiavon, who was elected on 2019 with a centre-left coalition as his predecessors.

Demographic evolution

Twin towns
Ponte San Nicolò is twinned with:

  Crest, Drôme, France
  Gmina Dobra, Police County, Poland

References

External links
 www.comune.pontesannicolo.pd.it/

Cities and towns in Veneto